Redbird is an unincorporated community in southern Gasconade County, Missouri, United States. The community lies on Price Creek, a small tributary of the Bourbeuse River and approximately one half mile southwest of the Bourbeuse. Owensville lies about eleven miles to the north-northeast and St. James lies about twelve miles to the south-southwest.

History
Redbird (or Red Bird) was so named by its first postmaster, because he thought it would be an easy name to spell and remember.

References

Unincorporated communities in Gasconade County, Missouri
Unincorporated communities in Missouri